"Body II Body" is a song by Irish singer Samantha Mumba, released as the second single from her debut album, Gotta Tell You (2000), on 16 October 2000. David Bowie's 1980 song "Ashes to Ashes" is sampled heavily in the song. "Body II Body" reached number two in Ireland, number five in the United Kingdom, number nine in Iceland, and number 14 in Australia.

Track listings

UK and Australian CD1
 "Body II Body" – 3:57
 "Believe in Me" – 3:31
 "The Way It Makes You Feel" – 3:30
 "Body II Body" (CD-ROM video)

UK CD2
 "Body II Body" (radio edit) – 3:15
 "Body II Body" (Robbie Rivera's vocal mix) – 7:10
 "Body II Body" (Tall Paul vocal mix) – 6:32

UK cassette single
 "Body II Body" (radio edit) – 3:15
 "Body II Body" (Oxide mix) – 5:23

European CD single
 "Body II Body" (radio edit) – 3:15
 "Body II Body" (Soul Inside Bounce mix) – 5:42

French CD single
 "Body II Body" (radio edit) – 3:15
 "Gotta Tell You" – 3:20

Australian CD2
 "Body II Body" (radio edit) – 3:15
 "Body II Body" (Robbie Rivera's vocal mix) – 7:10
 "Body II Body" (Soul Inside Bounce mix) – 5:42
 "Body II Body" (Soul Inside Smooth mix) – 6:32
 "Body II Body" (Flex mix) – 7:32

Credits and personnel
Credits are lifted from the UK CD1 liner notes.

Studios
 Recorded at The Strongroom, Stanley House (London, England), and Bluetone Studios (Somerville, Massachusetts)
 Mixed at Stanley House (London, England)
 Mastered at 777 Productions (London, England)

Personnel

 Lukas Burton – writing, production
 Sacha Skarbek – writing, co-production
 David Bowie – writing
 Michelle John Douglas – backing vocals
 Jayne Tretton – backing vocals
 Charlie Casey – guitar
 Lawrence Johnson – additional vocal production
 Yan Memmi – recording engineer, mix engineering
 Chris Wyles – recording engineer
 Phelan Kane – digital services
 Arun Chakraverty – mastering
 Donald Christie – photography

Charts

Weekly charts

Year-end charts

Release history

References

2000 singles
2000 songs
Polydor Records singles
Samantha Mumba songs
Songs written by David Bowie
Songs written by Lukas Burton
Songs written by Sacha Skarbek